Jyotsna or Jyoshna (Sanskrit: ज्योत्स्ना) is a Sanskrit word meaning moonlight. It is also a common (feminine) given name in India.

 Jyoshna (Joanne La Trobe), New Zealand devotional singer/song writer
 Jyotsna Bhatt, Indian ceramicist
 Jyotsna Chandola, Indian actress
 Jyotsna Patel, former Test cricketer who represented India
 Jyotsna Radhakrishnan, playback singer in Malayalam cinema
 Jyotsna Srikanth, Indian violinist and composer
 Jyotsna Vaid, professor of psychology at Texas University
 Jyotsna Kamat, Indian historian and writer